Try My Love is the third single released by the american singer Jeremy Jordan from his first (and only) studio album Try My Love. It was released in 1993, and was composed by Nick Mundy. A music video directed by Antoine Fuqua was also released to promote the single. It was a minor hit in Australia, peaking #72 in the ARIA Charts. The song was included in the Rob Bowman's 1993 comedy-drama film Airborne.

Track listing
EU maxi-single

Try My Love (Radio Edit) 4:01
Try My Love (Album Version) 4:54
Try My Love (Instrumental) 4:56

Japan mini-single

Try My Love (Album Version) 4:52
Try My Love (Instrumental) 4:53

Charts

References

1993 singles
1992 songs
Giant Records (Warner) singles